Eedara Veera Venkata Satyanarayana (10 June 1956  21 January 2011) was an Indian film director, screenwriter and producer. He directed a total of 51 films in Telugu and Hindi and introduced many actors to Telugu cinema. He was well known for making comedy and melodrama films. In 2000, he established his own production company, E. V. V. Cinema. He died in 2011.

Biography

Early life
Satyanarayana was born on 10 June 1956 in Korumamidi village of West Godavari district in present-day Andhra Pradesh, India. His parents were Venkat Rao and Venkata Ratnam. He has two brothers who worked in the film industry as still photographers. His passion for films did not let him concentrate on his studies. Deciding to test his luck in the Telugu film industry, E V V discontinued his studies after Intermediate and moved to Chennai.

Film career 
E. V. V. faced many hardships during his early days in Chennai. His passion for films, relentless approach, persistence and determination to make it big in the industry attracted the attention of noted producer Navatha Krishnam Raju, with whose help he joined Devadas Kanakala as assistant director for the film O inti Bhagavatam.  Later, he worked under director Jandhyala for about 8 years and made 22 films like Nalugu Stambhalata (1982), Rendu Jella Seetha (1983), Nelavanka (1983),  Rendu Rella Aaru (1985), Aha Naa Pellanta (1987) and Hai Hai Nayaka (1989). He also worked as co-director for the movie Indrudu Chandrudu.
 
Satyanarayana's directorial debut, Chevilo Puvvu, was a major flop. He was so depressed that he contemplated leaving the film industry. His destiny changed when producer D. Ramanaidu gave him a chance to direct Prema Khaidi, which screened successfully in all centers. He followed in the path of his teacher, Jandhyala, and made successful comedy movies. His first movie in the comedy genre was Appula Appa Rao, followed by Aa Okkati Adakku and Jamba Lakidi Pamba. He also directed family sentiment films, most prominent among them the 1994 super hit film Aame, starring Srikanth and Ooha. He also directed movies like Hello Brother, Alluda Majaka, Intlo Illalu Vantintlo Priyuralu, Goppinti Alludu, and Varasudu, and the Hindi movie Sooryavansham, which starred Amitabh Bachchan and Soundarya. He also directed critically acclaimed movies like Thaali, Kanyadanam and Ammo! Okato Tareekhu.

Death
E. V. V. Satyanarama died on 21 January 2011, following multiple complications from chemotherapy for throat cancer, which led to sepsis and cardiac arrest.

Awards
E. V. V. Satyanarayana was presented a Nandi Award in 1994 for the film Aame.

Filmography

Director

Writer
Sooryavansham (1999) (screenplay)
Maavidaakulu (1998) (story)
Maa Nannaki Pelli (1997) (screen adaptation)
Akkada Ammayi Ikkada Abbayi (1996) (writer)
Aame (1994) (story)
Alibaba Aradajanu Dongalu (1994) (story)
Hello Brother (1994) (story)
Aa Okkati Adakku (1993) (writer)
Jamba Lakidi Pamba (1993) (story)
420 (1992) (screenplay) (story)
Appula Appa Rao (1991) (story)

Associate director
Hai Hai Nayaka (1989)
Indrudu Chandrudu (1989)
Aha Naa Pellanta (1987)
Nalugu Stambhaalaata (1982)

Assistant director
Rendu Rella Aaru (1985)
Rendu Jella Seetha (1983)

Actor
Indrudu Chandrudu (1989) ... Police Inspector

Producer
Chala Bagundi (2000)
Maa Aavida Meedottu Mee Aavida Chala Manchidi (2001)
Thotti Gang (2002)
Nuvvante Naakistam (2003)
Aaruguru Pativratalu (2004)
Kithakithalu (2005)
Athili Sattibabu LKG (2007)
Fitting Master (2008)

References

External links
 
E V V Satyanarayana Photo Gallery – Telugu Cinema Director

1956 births
2011 deaths
Telugu film producers
Telugu film directors
Deaths from oral cancer
Deaths from cancer in India
People from West Godavari district
Telugu screenwriters
Screenwriters from Andhra Pradesh
Film directors from Andhra Pradesh
Indian male screenwriters
20th-century Indian film directors
20th-century Indian dramatists and playwrights
Indian male dramatists and playwrights
Film producers from Andhra Pradesh
20th-century Indian male writers